Svenska Cupen 1943 was the third season of the main Swedish football Cup. The competition was concluded on 3 October and 14 November 1943 with the Final, held at Råsunda Stadium, Solna in Stockholms län. IFK Norrköping drew 0–0 against AIK and won the replay 5–2 at Norrköping a month later before an attendance of 19,595 spectators.

Preliminary round

For other results see SFS-Bolletinen - Matcher i Svenska Cupen.

First round

For other results see SFS-Bolletinen - Matcher i Svenska Cupen.

Second round
The 8 matches in this round were played on 9 and 11 July 1943.

Quarter-finals
The 4 matches in this round were played on 16 July and 18 July 1943.

Semi-finals
The semi-finals in this round were played on 25 July and 12 September 1943.

Final
The final was played on 3 October at the Råsunda Stadium followed by the replay on 14 November 1943 at Norrköping.

Footnotes

References 

1943
Cup
Sweden